Los Angeles County+USC Medical Center, also known as County/USC, or by the abbreviation LAC+USC (and sometimes still referred to by its former name Los Angeles County General), is a 600-bed public teaching hospital located at 2051 Marengo Street in the Boyle Heights neighborhood of Los Angeles, California. As implied by the name, the hospital facility is owned by the Los Angeles County and operated by the Los Angeles County Department of Health Services, while doctors are faculty of the Keck School of Medicine of USC, who oversee more than 1,000 medical residents being trained by the faculty.

The facility is one of two level I trauma centers (providing the highest level of surgical care to trauma patients) operated by Los Angeles County, the other is Harbor-UCLA Medical Center.

Operations
Los Angeles County+USC Medical Center is one of the largest public hospitals and medical training centers in the United States, and the largest single provider of healthcare in Los Angeles County. It provides healthcare services for the region's medically underserved, is a Level I trauma center and treats over 28 percent of the region's trauma victims (2005). It provides care for half of all sickle-cell anemia patients and those people living with AIDS in Southern California.

The LAC+USC Medical Center provides a full spectrum of emergency, inpatient and outpatient services to all including indigent and Medi-Cal only recipients. These include medical, surgical, emergency/trauma, obstetrical, gynecological and pediatric services as well as psychiatric services for adults, adolescents and children.

LAC+USC is one of the busiest public hospitals in the Western United States, with nearly 39,000 inpatients discharged, and one million ambulatory care patient visits each year. The Emergency Department is one of the world's busiest, with more than 150,000 visits per year. LAC+USC operates one of only three burn centers in Los Angeles County and one of the few Level III Neonatal Intensive Care Units in Southern California. LAC+USC is also the home of the Los Angeles County College of Nursing and Allied Health, which has prepared registered nurses for professional practice since its founding in 1895.

LAC+USC also serves as the host facility for the U.S. Navy's Trauma Training Center, allowing uniformed medical professionals valuable exposure to trauma cases that prepare them to treat battlefield injury on the front lines with the United States Marine Corps, at sea with the Navy, or ashore at Fleet Hospitals and Shock Trauma Platoons.

In 2013, American Cancer Society awarded LAC+USC with the Harold P. Freeman Award in recognition of the hospital's achievements to reduce cancer disparities among medically underserved populations.

New facility

The original hospital, located at 1200 State Street, opened in 1933. Designed by the coalition of architects Allied Architects Association, its Art-Deco construction earned it the nickname the "Great Stone Mother" and had 3,000 patient beds. The 1994 Northridge earthquake on January 17, 1994, renewed concerns about building safety codes, and specifically those for hospitals. The California Hospital Seismic Safety Law was signed into law on September 21, 1994. The new law took the 1200 State Street building out of compliance of earthquake and fire safety codes.

To address the problem, a new modern facility was proposed and constructed nearby, at 2051 Marengo Street. Designed by a joint venture of HOK and LBL Associated Architects, the new $1 billion hospital consists of three linked buildings: a clinic tower, a diagnostic and treatment tower, and an inpatient tower, in total supporting 600 patient beds. The new facility has a larger number of intensive care beds to handle patients in the aftermath of disasters.

The new facility was ready by 2010, and on July 23 of that year, the new hospital was opened. Transfer of all inpatients from Women's and Children's Hospital and the 1200 State Street building made the retirement of the original hospital complex official. 

The old building at 1200 State Street still stands. The Wellness Center, on the first floor of the old building, was opened in 2014. It is open to the public and includes offices for nonprofit organizations, community outreach and classes for wellness activities, a dance studio, a small YMCA on State Street, and extensive new landscaping. While this building no longer meets the California Hospital Seismic Safety Law, it does meet current seismic standards for non-hospital use.

In 2020, the original pediatrics and obstetrics ward was torn down in order to be replaced by affordable housing.

History

The Los Angeles County Hospital and the University of Southern California Medical School were first affiliated in 1885, five years after USC was founded. It was originally established as a 100-bed hospital with 47 patients. The present-day LAC+USC complex is adjacent to the University of Southern California Health Sciences Campus, which includes the USC Keck School of Medicine, USC School of Pharmacy, Keck Hospital of USC, and the USC Norris Comprehensive Cancer Center and Hospital.

Transportation
The station of the same name on the El Monte Busway for the Metro J Line and Foothill Transit Silver Streak is located within walking distance from the hospital. Additionally, Metro lines 70, 71, 106, 251, 605 serve the hospital.

In popular culture

 Marilyn Monroe was born in the charity ward on June 1, 1926. The hospital also has a jail ward. In 1954, Stan Getz was processed in the jail ward as his wife Beverly gave birth to their third child one floor below. He had been arrested for attempting to rob a pharmacy to get a morphine fix.
 The 1962 film The Interns starring Cliff Robertson was filmed in and around the hospital.
 The hospital was featured briefly in the 1953 version of The War of the Worlds directed by Byron Haskins in scenes depicting the evacuation of Los Angeles from the oncoming Martians.
 The distinct Art Deco-style main building served as the exterior of the hospital in the 1998 movie City of Angels. In Terminator: The Sarah Connor Chronicles, the episode entitled "The Good Wound", exterior shots of the older LAC+USC facility to represent the hospital where Riley was being held. The outside of the hospital appeared in the television series Dr. Kildare, where it was known as "Blair General Hospital". There were a number of scenes filmed in one of the hospital's larger operating theaters in the TV series Ben Casey. The hospital also appears in the movie El Norte. The stairs and front entrance of the original LAC+USC Medical Center is seen in a scene in the 1993 film Blood In, Blood Out when one of the main characters is released after being treated for gunshot wounds. The exterior is also used in shots portraying Jessica Alba's hospital stay in the 2008 horror movie The Eye. The exterior can be seen towards the end of Hold Back the Dawn, when Georges visits Emmy after her accident.
 Beginning in 1975, the ABC soap opera General Hospital began using the facility for its exterior shots, appearing primarily in the show's opening sequence, where it still remains. The lower 'floors' of the show's Los Angeles studio (as with most television series, the show's one-floor set with several smaller floor sets features a dummy elevator to maintain the illusion of a several-floor set) are modeled after the actual hospital's emergency department entrance, allowing for the show to shoot outdoor scenes in their own parking lot. On their spin-off, General Hospital: Night Shift, the upper floors were edited in digitally to fit on top of the show's studio, creating a CGI look, modeled after the real hospital's original exterior. An animated version of the exterior is used in the current opening.
 In E.T. the Extra-Terrestrial, the doctors who try to save E.T. after government agents take over Elliott's home were recruited from the USC Medical Center. Spielberg felt that actual doctors could deliver the lines of medical dialogue more naturally than actors.
 A CBS medical drama titled Code Black ran from 2015 to 2018. While set at the fictitious "Angels Memorial Hospital", the exterior shots are of LAC-USC Medical Center and is loosely based on the 2014 documentary of the same name.
 In the English version of 2007 video game Apollo Justice: Ace Attorney, Phoenix Wright gets admitted here after becoming the victim of a hit-and-run. The suicide of famous magician Magnifi Gramarye, who was in hospital with liver cancer and diabetes, also took place here.
 Visiting... with Huell Howser Episode 1705

Deaths
 George de Rue Meiklejohn (1857–1929).
 Kiko Bejines (1962–1983)

See also
 No más bebés
 Knocking, a documentary on Jehovah's Witnesses, featuring LAC+USC Medical Center

References

External links

 Official website
 This hospital in the CA Healthcare Atlas A project by OSHPD

Hospitals in Los Angeles
Hospitals in Los Angeles County, California
County hospitals in California
Teaching hospitals in California
Keck School of Medicine of USC
Skyscrapers in Los Angeles
University of Southern California buildings and structures
Hospitals established in 1878
1878 establishments in California
Hospital buildings completed in 1933
Hospital buildings completed in 2010
Medical
Healthcare in Los Angeles
Boyle Heights, Los Angeles
Art Deco architecture in California
Trauma centers
Allied Architects Association buildings
Public hospitals in the United States